Crouse is a surname. Notable people with the surname include:

Buck Crouse (1897–1983), American catcher in Major League Baseball
David Crouse (born 1971), short story writer and teacher
Deriek Crouse, a police officer murdered at the Virginia Polytechnic Institute and State University in 2011
George W. Crouse (1832–1912), U.S. Representative from Ohio
Hans Crouse (born 1998), American baseball player
Jeff Crouse, American artist and creative technologist
Jennifer Crouse (born 1977), American basketball player
Karen Crouse, American journalist and author
Lawson Crouse, (born 1997), Canadian ice hockey player
Lindsay Crouse (born 1948), American actress
Lindsay and Crouse, Howard Lindsay and Russel Crouse, American writers of plays and musicals
Lloyd Crouse (1918–2007) Canadian businessman and politician
Nolan Crouse (born 1953), Canadian businessman and politician, mayor of St. Albert, Alberta 2007–2017
Richard Crouse (born 1963), Canadian television personality
Russel Crouse (1893–1966), American playwright and librettist
Timothy Crouse, American journalist and writer
Wayne Crouse (1924–2000), viola professor emeritus at the University of Oklahoma

See also
Crouse, North Carolina
Crouse Creek, a stream in Utah
The Crouse Library for Publishing Arts, New York